Ox is a Canadian alternative country band based in Vancouver, British Columbia and later Sudbury, Ontario. The core of the band consists of Mark Browning on lead vocals and guitar, Ryan Bishops on guitar and piano, Shawn Dicey on bass and Max Myth on drums. Jesse Zubot, Nathan Lawr, Kevin Kane and the members of Be Good Tanyas are among the band's frequent guest collaborators.

History
Ox was formed in Vancouver in 2003 after Browning and Bishops moved there from Sudbury. The band released its debut album, Dust Bowl Revival, in 2003. The album was popular on Canadian campus radio where it reached No. 1 across Canada (#56 in the USA CMJ Chart), and the band toured across Canada, the United States and Europe to support the album.

In 2005 the band released a joint album with American band Kid Lightning.

They released their second album, American Lo-Fi, in October 2006. The album reached No. 6 across Canada in !earshot. The band subsequently moved its home base back to Browning's hometown of Sudbury.

Their third album, Burnout, was released in November 2009, and reached No. 5 in !earshot. Subsequently, Ox filmed music videos for the tracks "Unknown Legend" and "Prom Queen" with director John Alden Milne, who also directed a video for their independently released 2011 album tUCo. This album was intended as the sound track for a film project which didn't happen. It appeared on the !earshot Campus and Community National Top 50 Albums chart in January, 2012, along with another of their releases, Silent Night & Other Cowboy Songs.

Discography
 Dust Bowl Revival (2003)
 IPX No. 6 (2004, split CD with Kid Lightning)
 American Lo Fi (2006)
 Burnout (2009)
 tUCo (2011)
 Silent Night & Other Cowboy Songs (2012)

References

External links
 Ox official website

Musical groups established in 2003
Musical groups from Vancouver
Canadian alternative country groups
Musical groups from Greater Sudbury
2003 establishments in British Columbia